Talo or TALO may refer to:

 Talo (food), a type of bread originating from the Basque Country
 TALO, an Estonian trade union
 Talo colony, a colony of Galoli language speakers located on the Wetar island

Places
 Talo Monastery, a Buddhist temple in Bhutan
 Talo Dam, a dam on the Bani River, Mali
 Lefter Talo, a village in the Livadhja municipality, Albania
 Ta Lo, a fictional realm in the Marvel Cinematic Universe